The Kosovo Operation (15 October–22 November 1944) was a series of military operations leading up to one final push during World War II, launched by the Bulgarian army (commanded by Major General Kiril Stanchev) with the assistance of Albanian and Yugoslav Partisans to expel German forces from Kosovo and prevent the retreat of German forces from Greece. German Army Group E was withdrawing through it from Greece towards Bosnia, since the escape route through Niš and Belgrade had been closed by the Yugoslav Partisan, Bulgarian and Soviet forces (during the Belgrade Offensive).

The operation resulted in the capture of Kosovo by the Communists, although the Germans were able to successfully withdraw most of their forces and break out of the encirclement the combined communist forces had set up. By the end of the month Bulgarian 9th Infantry Division pursued the retreating enemy and reached the defensive line Raška–Novi Pazar.

Background

Developments in Kosovo
After the capitulation of Italian forces on 8 September 1943, German troops swiftly occupied Albania with two divisions. Most of the Kosovo region lay within the enlarged Albanian state. The Germans formed a "neutral government" in Tirana, that remained closely associated with Nazi Germany throughout 1943 and 1944. During this time the Partisan movement in Kosovo remained relatively small compared to other regions of Yugoslavia. Svetozar Vukmanović, who was charged with organising Communist forces, noted that "conditions for armed resistance in Kosovo were worse than in any other region of the country" and that most of "the Albanian population had an unfriendly attitude towards the Partisans". In light of this, the Partisans made little headway in Kosovo itself with most of the region remaining in the hands of the Albanian nationalist Balli Kombëtar movement.

Regional developments
As a result of the Bulgarian coup d'état of 1944, the Pro-German monarchist regime in Bulgaria was overthrown and replaced with a government of the Fatherland Front led by Kimon Georgiev. Once the new government came to power, Bulgaria declared war on Germany. Under the new pro-Soviet government, four Bulgarian armies, 455,000 strong were mobilized and reorganized. In early October 1944, three Bulgarian armies, consisting of around 340,000 men, were located on the Yugoslav – Bulgarian border. This development significantly altered the balance of power in the region and the Bulgarian troops were immediately thrown into action alongside the Soviet and Yugoslav Partisan forces. Two offensives launched in late September, the Belgrade Offensive and the Niš operation, succeed in clearing Central and Southern Serbia of German forces. These developments put German Army Group E retreating from Greece under intense pressure with the threat of the remaining troops being encircled and cut off from the main German forces.

Operation
The main forces involved in this undertaking were Bulgarian 2nd Army supported by the Yugoslav 24th and 46th Divisions as well as the 1st through 5th "Kosovo-Metohija" Brigades and the Albanian 3rd and 5th Brigades of the People's Liberation Army of Albania. These forces were assisted by air sorties of the Western Allies and the Soviets against units of Generaloberst Alexander Löhr's Army Group "E" as the latter retreated from Greece. The Axis order of battle against the Bulgarians and Yugoslavs in this operation comprised some 17,000 men including the Kampfgruppe "Langer" with three infantry companies, one artillery battery and one platoon of tanks, Kampfgruppe "Bredow" with six infantry battalions, three artillery battalions and 10 tanks), Kampfgruppe "Skanderbeg" with about 7,000 men of Waffen-SS August Schmidhuber's 21st Mountain Division "Skanderbeg" and about 4,000 German navy personnel making their way to the north from Greece.

The Germans were supported by some 10,000 men of the Balli Kombëtar (National Front), the Albanian nationalist, anti-communist and anti-monarchist organisation. The Albanian nationalist forces and the 21st Waffen Mountain Division SS "Skanderbeg" served as the rearguard for the Wehrmacht's retreat, helping the Germans successfully withdraw large forces from Greece and Albania. The SS Skanderbeg was extensively utilised by the Germans, advancing into the mountains and engaging Partisan troops on a daily basis, to cover the flanks of the Wehrmacht. As the offensive against the Germans drove into full swing the SS "Skanderbeg" was issued with orders to increase repression of the Partisan forces and any sympathisers. In keeping with these orders, 131 NLM (Albanian Partisan) prisoners were shot or hanged in Kosovo by members of the division by 23 October.

Aftermath

Freeing the Kosovo region from the Germans did not bring immediate peace and order. After the Germans had been driven out, Tito ordered the collection of weapons in Kosovo and the arrest of prominent Albanians. The order was not well received and, combined with passions felt about Kosovo, inflamed an insurrection. On 2 December 1944, anti-communist Albanians from the Drenica region attacked the Trepca mining complex and other targets. Numbering at most 2,000 men, these anti-communists managed to hold off a Partisan force of 30,000 troops for two months. Now "an armed uprising of massive proportions" broke out in Kosovo led by the Balli Kombëtar (which still had around 9,000 men under arms at the time), which aimed to resist incorporation of Kosovo into communist Yugoslavia. It was only in July 1945 that the Yugoslav Partisans were able to put down the uprising and establish their control over Kosovo.

See also
Stratsin-Kumanovo operation
Bregalnitsa-Strumica operation
Niš operation

Citations

Sources

 

 

Battles and operations of World War II
Military operations of World War II involving Germany
History of Kosovo
Yugoslavia in World War II
Battles involving the Yugoslav Partisans
Military operations of World War II involving Bulgaria
1944 in Yugoslavia
Conflicts in 1944
Military history of Albania during World War II
Albania–Yugoslavia relations
October 1944 events
November 1944 events